Major Roland Edward Elcock VC MM (5 June 1899 – 6 October 1944) was an English recipient of the Victoria Cross, the highest and most prestigious award for gallantry in the face of the enemy that can be awarded to British and Commonwealth forces.

Elcock was born on 5 June 1899. He initially enlisted in the British Army in October 1914 when he was 15. Being underage for army service, he was discharged when his real age was discovered. He worked as a clerk in Wolverhampton before re-enlisting at the age of 18.

He was 19 years old, and an acting corporal in the 11th Battalion, The Royal Scots (The Lothian Regiment), British Army during the First World War, and was awarded the VC for his actions on 15 October 1918 south-east of Capelle St. Catherine, France.
 
Corporal Elcock was in charge of a Lewis gun team, and entirely on his own initiative he rushed his gun up to within 10 yards of enemy guns which were causing heavy casualties and holding up the advance. He put both guns out of action, capturing five prisoners and undoubtedly saved the whole attack from being held up. Later, near the River Lys, this NCO again attacked an enemy machine-gun and captured the crew.

He later achieved the rank of major after enlisting in the British Indian Army during World War II. He died in October 1944.

His Victoria Cross is displayed at the Royal Scots Museum, Edinburgh Castle, Scotland.

References

Further reading
Monuments to Courage (David Harvey, 1999)
The Register of the Victoria Cross (This England, 1997)
VCs of the First World War - The Final Days 1918 (Gerald Gliddon, 2000)

1899 births
1944 deaths
People from Wolverhampton
Royal Scots soldiers
Royal Scots officers
British Indian Army officers
British World War I recipients of the Victoria Cross
Recipients of the Military Medal
British Army personnel of World War I
Indian Army personnel of World War II
Military personnel from Staffordshire
British Army recipients of the Victoria Cross
Child soldiers in World War I